Libertyville is the name of some places in the United States:

Libertyville, Alabama
Libertyville, Illinois, the largest community bearing this name and hometown of Adlai Stevenson II.
Libertyville, Indiana
Libertyville, Iowa
Libertyville, Missouri